Chow Cheuk Fung (born 1 August 1989 in Hong Kong) is a former Hong Kong professional footballer who currently plays as an amateur player for Hong Kong First Division club Icanfield.

Club career
During his youth, Chow trained with Hong Kong Rangers academy. In 2006, Chow moved to Tuen Mun where his father was also the Director of Football, in order to assist with his family's transportation business.

During the 2008–09 season, Chow led Tuen Mun to the Hong Kong Third District Division League title and first place in the Final Round. The following season, he led Tuen Mun to their second successive promotion, finishing runners up in the 2009-10 Second Division season. As a result of reaching the top flight, Chow was rewarded with a full-time contract.

On 11 January 2011, Chow scored the first goal of his professional career in a Hong Kong League Cup match against South China.

Chow returned to Rangers in the summer of 2012 after six years with Tuen Mun. On 5 February 2016, Chow scored his first goal in four years in a 2015–16 Hong Kong FA Cup Round 1 victory over Sun Hei.

In June 2017, Chow signed a contract with R&F worth a monthly salary of HKD 50,000.

International career
In 2011, Chow was named to the Hong Kong national under-23 football team for the 2012 Olympic qualifiers. On 23 March 2015, Chow was selected but did not appear with the Hong Kong national football team for a friendly against Guam.

References

External links
 Chow Cheuk Fung at HKFA
 

1989 births
Hong Kong people
Hong Kong footballers
Association football midfielders
Tuen Mun SA players
Hong Kong Rangers FC players
Metro Gallery FC players
R&F (Hong Kong) players
Hong Kong First Division League players
Hong Kong Premier League players
Living people